Sikhera is a village in Simbhaoli block of Hapur District in Uttar Pradesh state, India. This village has Tyagi community and Muslims.

Villages in Hapur district